Hababo Guduru is one of woredas in the Oromia Region of Ethiopia. It is part of the Horo Gudru Welega Zone. It was separated from Guduru woreda.

Demographics 
The 2007 national census reported a total population for this woreda of 45,325, of whom 22,744 were men and 22,581 were women; 2,364 or 5.22% of its population were urban dwellers. The majority of the inhabitants observed Ethiopian Orthodox Christianity, with 42.15% reporting that as their religion, while 40.19% were Protestants, and 16.93% observed traditional beliefs.

Notes 

Districts of Oromia Region